Burgh Walls Camp is a multivallate Iron Age hill fort in the North Somerset district of Somerset, England. The hillfort has some alternative names such as Bower Walls Camp, Burwalls, or Bowre Walls.

Burgh Walls Camp is one of three Iron Age fortifications overlooking the Avon Gorge, the others being Stokeleigh Camp and Clifton Camp on the opposite side of the gorge, on Clifton Down near the Observatory.

See also
List of hillforts and ancient settlements in Somerset

References

History of Somerset
Hill forts in Somerset
Iron Age sites in Somerset
Scheduled monuments in North Somerset